Valeria Rivas Mosquera (born 23 April 2000) is a Colombian weightlifter. She won the silver medal in the women's 81kg event at the 2021 World Weightlifting Championships held in Tashkent, Uzbekistan. She won two silver medals at the 2022 Bolivarian Games held in Valledupar, Colombia.

She won the gold medal in the women's 81kg event at the Pan American Weightlifting Championships held in Guayaquil, Ecuador.

Achievements

References

External links 
 

Living people
2000 births
Place of birth missing (living people)
Colombian female weightlifters
World Weightlifting Championships medalists
Pan American Weightlifting Championships medalists
21st-century Colombian women